or hidden people are elves in Icelandic and Faroese folklore. They are supernatural beings that live in nature. They look and behave similarly to humans, but live in a parallel world. They can make themselves visible at will.  cites a 19th-century Icelandic source claiming that the only visible difference between normal people and outwardly human-appearing  is, the latter have a convex rather than concave philtrum below their noses.

In Faroese folk tales, hidden people are said to be "large in build, their clothes are all grey, and their hair black. Their dwellings are in mounds, and they are also called Elves." 
Some Icelandic folk tales caution against throwing stones, as it may hit the hidden people.

There is, however, some evidence that the two terms have come to be taken as referring to two distinct sets of supernatural beings in contemporary Iceland. Katrin Sontag found that some people do not differentiate elves from hidden people, while others do. A 2006 survey found that "54% of respondents did not distinguish between elves and hidden people, 20% did and 26% said they were not sure."

Origins 
He also writes: " and  undoubtedly arose from the same need. Over time, they became two different beings, but really they are two different sets of folklore that mean the same thing."

Elves were also mentioned in Poetic Edda, and appear to be connected to fertility.

The Christianization of Iceland in the 11th century brought with it new religious concepts. According to one Christian folk tale, the origins of the hidden people can be traced to Adam and Eve. Eve hid her dirty, unwashed children from God, and lied about their existence. God then declared: "What man hides from God, God will hide from man." Other Christian folktales claim that hidden people originate from Lilith, or are fallen angels condemned to live between heaven and hell.

In succession of Christianization, official opposition to dancing may have begun in Iceland as early as the 12th century, and the association of dancing with elves can be seen as early as the 15th century. One folktale shows the elves siding with the common people and taking revenge on a sheriff who banned dance parties.  concludes that these legends "show that Icelanders missed dancing".

In the 13th and 14th centuries, books from mainland Europe reached Iceland, and may have influenced folktales about elves.

 writes: "Round about 1600 sources for hidden folk become so voluminous that we can readily define the beliefs and legends about them, and after that there is one source after another about them right down into the twentieth century." According to Árni Björnsson, belief in hidden people grew during the 17th and 18th centuries when Iceland was facing tough times.

Holidays 
There are four Icelandic holidays considered to have a special connection with hidden people: New Year's Eve, Thirteenth Night (January 6), Midsummer Night and Christmas night. Elf bonfires are a common part of the holiday festivities on Twelfth Night (January 6). There are many Icelandic folktales about elves and hidden people invading Icelandic farmhouses during Christmas and holding wild parties. On New Year's Eve, it is believed that the elves move to new locations, and Icelanders leave candles to help them find their way. On Midsummer Night, folklore states that if you sit at a crossroads, elves will attempt to seduce you with food and gifts; there are grave consequences for being seduced by their offers, but great rewards for resisting.

Icelandic and Faroese folklore 

Several scholars have commented on the connections between hidden people and the Icelandic natural environment. B.S. Benedikz, in his discussion of Jón Árnason's grouping of folktales about elves, water-dwellers, and trolls together, writes: "The reason is of course perfectly clear. When one's life is conditioned by a landscape dominated by rocks twisted by volcanic action, wind and water into ferocious and alarming shapes... the imagination fastens on these natural phenomena."

Ólina Thorvarðardóttir writes: "Oral tales concerning Icelandic elves and trolls no doubt served as warning fables. They prevented many children from wandering away from human habitations, taught Iceland's topographical history, and instilled fear and respect for the harsh powers of nature."

Michael Strmiska writes: "The  are... not so much supernatural as ultranatural, representing not an overcoming of nature in the hope of a better deal beyond but a deep reverence for the land and the mysterious powers able to cause fertility or famine."  claims that in a landscape filled with earthquakes, avalanches, and volcanoes, "it is no wonder that the native people have assigned some secret life to the landscape. There had to be some unseen powers behind such unpredictability, such cruelty." Alan Boucher writes: "Thus the Icelander's ambivalent attitude towards nature, the enemy and the provider, is clearly expressed in these stories, which preserve a good deal of popular—and in some cases probably pre-christian—belief."

Robert Anderson writes that syncretism "is active in Iceland where Christianity, spiritism, and Icelandic elf lore have syncretized in at least a couple instances."

Terry Gunnell notes that hidden people legends recorded in the 18th and 19th centuries showed them to be "near mirror-images of those humans who told stories about them—except they were beautiful, powerful, alluring, and free from care, while the Icelanders were often starving and struggling for existence. The  seem in many ways to represent the Icelander's dreams of a more perfect and happy existence." Anthropologist  claimed that hidden people tales told by 19th-century Icelandic women were a reflection of how only 47% of women were married, and "sisters often found themselves relegated to very different functions and levels of status in society... the vast majority of Icelandic girls were shunted into supporting roles in the household." He goes on to say that these stories justified the differences in role and status between sisters, and "inculcated in young girls the... stoic adage never to despair, which was a psychological preparedness many would need as they found themselves reduced in status and denied the proper outlet for their sexuality in marriage, thereby sometimes having to rely on infanticide to take care of the unsolicited and insupportable effects of their occasional amours, an element... related in  stories."

 contends that the hidden people symbolize idealized Icelandic identity and society, the key elements of which are seeing the "past as a source of pride and nature as unique and pure."

Hidden people often appear in the dreams of Icelanders. They are usually described as wearing 19th-century Icelandic clothing, and are often described as wearing green.

In one version of modern Faroese folklore, the hidden people vanished in the 1950s when electricity was brought to the island.

Contemporary Iceland 
A survey of Icelanders born between 1870 and 1920 found that people did not generally believe in hidden people and that when they had learned about supernatural beings in their youth, those lessons had mostly been made for amusement. About 10% seemed to actually believe in hidden people. A survey from 1974 showed that among those born between 1904 and 1944, 7% were certain of the existence of hidden people.

Several modern surveys have been made showing a surprising number of believers. Around 7–8% claim to be certain that elves exist, and around 45% claim it is likely or possible.

These surveys have been criticized as being misrepresentative, as journalists have claimed that they show that a majority of Icelanders believe in elves, despite belief not being that serious. Folklore professor Terry Gunnell has said: "Very few will say immediately that they 'believe' in such, but they won't deny it either." Different ways of asking could elicit very different responses.

Árni Björnsson claims the beliefs are simplified and exaggerated for the entertainment of children and tourists, and that it is a somewhat misrepresentative yet harmless trick used by the tourism industry to entice visitors. The stories of elves may have been fun tales rather than beliefs.

Tourism 
The Icelandic Elf School in  organizes five-hour-long educational excursions for visitors.

 offers a "Hidden Worlds tour", a guided walk of about 90 minutes. It includes a stroll through  Park, where the paths wind through a lava field planted with tall trees and potted bonsai trees in summer, and said to be peopled with the town's largest elf colony.

 has the Icelandic Wonders museum, where "Museum guests will walk into a world of the Icelandic elves and hidden people and get a glimpse of their life."

Recent incidents 
During road construction in Kópavogur in 1971, a bulldozer broke down. The driver placed the blame on elves living in a large rock. Despite locals not having been aware of any elves living in the rock, newspapers ran with the story, thus starting the myth that Icelandic road construction was often impeded by elves.

In 2004, Alcoa had to have a government expert certify that their chosen building site was free of archaeological sites, including ones related to  folklore, before they could build an aluminium smelter in Iceland. In 2011, elves/ were believed by some to be responsible for an incident in  where rocks rained down on residential streets.

Significant sites 

  (Elfin Hill), a hillock approximately 60 meters west of 
 ; areas include:
  Lava Park
  Cliffs
 near  swimming pool
  cliff
 
 
  (Elf Hill Road), a street in 
  in 
  in 
 
 
 
 
 
 
 The attic of Gimli Public School 1915 in the New Iceland Heritage Museum, Gimli, Manitoba

Modern cultural references 

 In the 2018 musical Frozen, based on the 2013 film of the same name, the characters which were depicted in the original movie as trolls, became in the Broadway show a reference to the Huldufólk, named in the musical "the hidden folk".
 Huldufólk is the title of French Nordic folk group SKÁLD's 2023 album.

See also 

 
 Domovoy
 Gnome
 
 Troll
 
 
 Vittra

Notes

References

Further reading 
 Ármann Jakobsson. “Beware of the Elf!: A note on the Evolving Meaning of Álfar,” Folklore 126 (2015), 215–23.
 
 
 
 
 
 
 
 
 
 
 
 
 
 
 

Icelandic folklore
Elves
European fairy tales